The men's super-G competition at the 2013 World Championships was held on Wednesday, 6 February. It was the first men's race of the championships; 82 athletes from 32 countries competed.

Ted Ligety won the world title, his first-ever victory in a super-G race in international competition. A top competitor in giant slalom, his only previous podium in super-G was a runner-up finish at a World Cup race at Val-d'Isère in December 2009. Completing the podium were Gauthier de Tessières, a late replacement, and Aksel Lund Svindal.

Kjetil Jansrud crashed and tore a ligament in his left knee, ending his 2013 season.

Results
The race was started on schedule at 11:00.

Video
YouTube.com – Ligety's gold medal run
YouTube.com – Tessières' silver medal run
YouTube.com – Svindal's bronze medal run

References

External links
  
 FIS-Ski.com - AWSC 2013 - calendar & results

Men's Super-G